WBRJ-LP (97.3 FM) is a radio station broadcasting a Christian contemporary music format. Licensed to Baton Rouge, Louisiana, United States, the station serves the Baton Rouge area.  The station is currently owned by Jefferson Baptist Church, Inc. The station's motto is "The Word from Baton Rouge". The station's listening area extends from Port Allen to Denham Springs and from Prairieville to Hooper Road in Baton Rouge.  Until sometime in 2010, the station was on 105.7.

References

External links
 

Low-power FM radio stations in Louisiana
Contemporary Christian radio stations in the United States
Radio stations established in 2007
2007 establishments in Louisiana
Christian radio stations in Louisiana